MVG may refer to:

Michael van Gerwen, a professional darts player
MVG, the airline code for Moldavian Airlines
Mothra vs. Godzilla, 1964 film
Münchner Verkehrsgesellschaft or Munich Transportation Company, the company responsible for operating public transport in Munich, Germany
MVG Museum, Munich museum about the above company
MVG Class A, class of train operated by the above company
MVG Class B, class of train operated by the above company
MVG Class C, class of train operated by the above company

See also
List of Major Vegetation Groups in Australia (MVGs)